Glazebrook East Junction–Skelton Junction line was a railway line from Glazebrook to Skelton Junction in Greater Manchester.

History 
The Glazebrook East Junction to Skelton Junction line was part of Cheshire Lines Committee (CLC) as a branch line of their main Liverpool–Manchester lines. The line carried on through Skelton Junction and terminated at Stockport Tiviot Dale.

It opened in 1873, serving the towns of Cadishead, Partington and West Timperley before joining the Manchester, South Junction and Altrincham Railway (MSJ&AR) at Skelton Junction, which was also part of the CLC at this time. In the 1890s the line was deviated due to the building of the Manchester Ship Canal. It was raised on an embankment around a mile in length from Glazebrook East Junction to be high enough to clear the Ship Canal, with the Cadishead Viaduct was built in 1892 to span the canal.

The line saw little change in the late 19th and early 20th centuries and it remained part of the CLC in the 1923 Grouping. On nationalisation it became part of the London Midland Region of British Railways in 1948 at the final demise of the CLC.

The line called at the following stations:

 Cadishead
 Partington
 West Timperley

As part of the London Midland region of BR, It remained a busy line with trains from Liverpool Central and Warrington Central up until the mid-1960s. It was only on the withdrawal of these stopping passenger services in 1964 that all the stations closed along the line. The line carried on as a freight only line until 1983 when the Cadishead Viaduct was in need of serious and costly repair. British Rail decided to close the viaduct and mothball the line rather than repairing it. The tracks were lifted in the mid-1980s from Glazebrook to Partington.

As the line was closed prior to the privatisation of British Rail, only Glazebrook East Junction and the line from south of Partington to Skelton Junction were passed over into Railtrack ownership, which in turn passed to Network Rail.

The trackbed from Cadishead to Partington remained (and remains to this day) part of the Historical Railways Estate.

Today

Glazebrook East Junction
Today, Glazebrook East Junction is still intact and remains part of the national network. The junction towards Cadishead on the original deviation is also still in place with a powered signal lamp showing a permanent red signal. This short section of track from the still live passing loop at Glazebrook East Junction towards Cadishead on the original non-deviated line is permanently point locked. The short section ends near a barrow crossing shortly before a bridge carrying a bridleway above.

Skelton Junction
The tracks from Skelton Junction to the south east of Partington were left and remained intact for chemical trains for a local chemical plant. These trains continued to use this route until 10 October 1993. To this day however this part of the line is intact but disused; the signal lamps at Skelton Junction remain powered red. Also in 2005 this part of the track saw some work; vegetation clearance took place for the line to reopen for freight but this fell through.

Reopening plans
In 2010 the Liberal Democrats announced plans to reopen thousands of miles of disused and abandoned tracks and it was hoped this line will reopen sometime in the future. This appeared to be an easy process as all the infrastructure of the line was still in place, bar the tracks and signalling. However, it would cost millions of pounds to bring Cadishead Viaduct up to a safe and usable standard along with all the other decaying bridges along the line, which have seen little or no maintenance in 26 years since the line was closed.

In 2017, businessman Neil McArthur launched a campaign to reopen the line as a heritage railway, with an adjoining footpath and cycle track.

In January 2019, Campaign for Better Transport released a report identifying the line which was listed as Priority 2 for reopening. Priority 2 is for those lines which require further development or a change in circumstances (such as housing developments).

In March 2020, a bid was made to the first round of the Restoring Your Railway Fund for a feasibility study into reopening the railway line, but this was unsuccessful.

In April 2020, Railfuture noted that reinstatement of the line would relieve the Castlefield Corridor of freight traffic.

References 

Rail transport in Greater Manchester
Railway lines opened in 1873
Railway lines in North West England
Beeching closures in England